The Convention on Road Traffic, commonly known as the Geneva Convention on Road Traffic, is an international treaty promoting the development and safety of international road traffic by establishing certain uniform rules among the contracting parties. The convention addresses minimum mechanical and safety equipment needed to be on board and defines an identification mark to identify the origin of the vehicle. The Convention was prepared and opened for signature by the United Nations Conference on Road and Motor Transport held at Geneva from 23 August to 19 September 1949. It came into force on 26 March 1952. This conference also produced the Protocol on Road Signs and Signals.

There is a European Agreement supplementing the 1949 Convention on Road Traffic, in addition to the 1949 Protocol on Road Signs and Signals, concluded in Geneva on 16 September 1950.

Contracting parties
The Geneva Convention on Road Traffic was concluded in Geneva on 19 September 1949. The convention has been ratified by 101 countries. Since its entry into force on 26 March 1952, between signatory countries ("Contracting Parties") it replaces previous road traffic conventions, notably the 1926 International Convention relative to Motor Traffic and the International Convention relative to Road Traffic, and the Convention on the Regulation of Inter-American Automotive Traffic in accordance with Article 30 of the Convention.

Many of the contracting parties have also ratified the newer convention the Vienna Convention on Road Traffic of 1968. Between signatory countries of the 1968 Vienna Convention, this replaces previous road traffic conventions including the Geneva Convention on Road Traffic, in accordance with Article 48 of the Vienna Convention.

Cross-border vehicles

One of the main benefits of the convention for motorists is the obligation on signatory countries to recognize the legality of vehicles from other signatory countries. The following requirements must be met when driving outside the country of registration:
 Cars must display their registration number (vehicle registration plate) at the rear at least. Registration numbers must consist either of figures or of figures and letters. They must be displayed in capital Latin characters and Arabic numerals. In addition to this, the registration number may optionally be displayed in a different alphabet. Registration numbers can not consist of only letters; according to the current wording of paragraph 1 of Annex 3, a vehicle with the registration number with only letters would not be allowed in international traffic. This requirement was proposed amended in 2016.
 A distinguishing sign of the country of registration must be displayed on the rear of the vehicle. This sign must be placed separately from the registration plate. It may not be incorporated into the vehicle registration plate (such as the EU format registration plates).
The physical requirements for the distinguishing sign are defined in Annex 4 of the Geneva Convention on Road Traffic, which states that the letters shall be in black on a white background having the shape of an ellipse with the major axis horizontal. 
The vehicle must meet all technical requirements to be legal for road use in the country of registration. Any conflicting technical requirements (e.g., right-hand-drive or left-hand-drive) in the signatory country where the vehicle is being driven do not apply.
 The driver must carry the vehicle's registration certificate, and if the vehicle is not registered in the name of an occupant of the vehicle (e.g., a hire car), proof of the driver's right to be in possession of the vehicle.

The requirement to display a distinguishing sign as defined in the Geneva Convention on Road Traffic is waived between some countries, for example within the European Economic Area, for vehicles with registration plates in the common EU format (which incorporates the distinguishing sign into the registration plate). This is also possible in countries party to the newer Vienna Convention on Road Traffic, and between Canada and the United States (where the province, state, or district of registration is usually embossed or surface-printed on the vehicle registration plate).

International Driving Permit 
The Geneva Convention on Road Traffic is one of three conventions that governs International Driving Permits. The other two are the 1926 Paris International Convention relative to Motor Traffic and the 1968 Vienna Convention on Road Traffic. When a state is contracting to more than one convention, the newest one terminate and replace previous ones in relation between those states.

The 1949 Convention's description of a driving permit and international driving permit are located in Annexes 9 and 10. The 1949 Geneva Convention states that an IDP remains valid for one year from the date of issue.

 "Permissible maximum weight" of a vehicle means the weight of the vehicle and its maximum load when the vehicle is ready for road.
 "Maximum load" means the weight of the load declared permissible by the competent authority of the country(or jurisdiction) of registration of the vehicle.
 "Light trailers" shall be those of permissible maximum weight not exceeding 750 kg (1,650 lbs).

See also
 List of international vehicle registration codes
 International Driving Permit
 Vienna Convention on Road Traffic
 Rules of the road

References

External links
Ratifications (list of countries)

Treaties concluded in 1949
Treaties entered into force in 1952
Transport treaties
1949 in Switzerland
Rules of the road
United Nations treaties
Treaties of the People's Socialist Republic of Albania
Treaties of Algeria
Treaties of Argentina
Treaties of Australia
Treaties of Austria
Treaties of Bangladesh
Treaties of Barbados
Treaties of Belgium
Treaties extended to the Belgian Congo
Treaties extended to Ruanda-Urundi
Treaties of the Republic of Dahomey
Treaties of Botswana
Treaties of the People's Republic of Bulgaria
Treaties of Burkina Faso
Treaties of the Kingdom of Cambodia (1953–1970)
Treaties of Canada
Treaties of the Central African Republic
Treaties of Chile
Treaties of the Republic of the Congo
Treaties of Ivory Coast
Treaties of Cuba
Treaties of Cyprus
Treaties of Czechoslovakia
Treaties of the Czech Republic
Treaties of the Republic of the Congo (Léopoldville)
Treaties of Denmark
Treaties extended to the Faroe Islands
Treaties extended to Greenland
Treaties of the Dominican Republic
Treaties of Ecuador
Treaties of the Republic of Egypt (1953–1958)
Treaties of Estonia
Treaties of Fiji
Treaties of Finland
Treaties of the French Fourth Republic
Treaties of Georgia (country)
Treaties of Ghana
Treaties of Greece
Treaties of Guatemala
Treaties of the Holy See
Treaties of Haiti
Treaties of the Hungarian People's Republic
Treaties of Iceland
Treaties of India
Treaties of Ireland
Treaties of Israel
Treaties of Italy
Treaties of Jamaica
Treaties of Japan
Treaties of Jordan
Treaties of Kyrgyzstan
Treaties of the Kingdom of Laos
Treaties of Lebanon
Treaties of Lesotho
Treaties of Luxembourg
Treaties of Madagascar
Treaties of Malawi
Treaties of the Federation of Malaya
Treaties of Mali
Treaties of Malta
Treaties of Monaco
Treaties of Montenegro
Treaties of Morocco
Treaties of Namibia
Treaties of the Netherlands
Treaties extended to Aruba
Treaties extended to the Netherlands Antilles
Treaties of New Zealand
Treaties of Niger
Treaties of Nigeria
Treaties of Norway
Treaties of Papua New Guinea
Treaties of Paraguay
Treaties of Peru
Treaties of the Philippines
Treaties of the Polish People's Republic
Treaties of the Estado Novo (Portugal)
Treaties of South Korea
Treaties of the Socialist Republic of Romania
Treaties of the Soviet Union
Treaties of Rwanda
Treaties of San Marino
Treaties of Senegal
Treaties of Serbia and Montenegro
Treaties of Yugoslavia
Treaties of Sierra Leone
Treaties of Singapore
Treaties of Slovakia
Treaties of the Union of South Africa
Treaties of the Dominion of Ceylon
Treaties of Francoist Spain
Treaties of Sweden
Treaties of the Syrian Republic (1930–1963)
Treaties of Thailand
Treaties of Togo
Treaties of Trinidad and Tobago
Treaties of Tunisia
Treaties of Turkey
Treaties of Uganda
Treaties of the United Arab Emirates
Treaties of the United Kingdom
Treaties extended to Gibraltar
Treaties extended to Guernsey
Treaties extended to the Isle of Man
Treaties extended to Jersey
Treaties of the United States
Treaties extended to American Samoa
Treaties extended to Baker Island
Treaties extended to Guam
Treaties extended to Howland Island
Treaties extended to Jarvis Island
Treaties extended to Johnston Atoll
Treaties extended to Midway Atoll
Treaties extended to Navassa Island
Treaties extended to the Trust Territory of the Pacific Islands
Treaties extended to Palmyra Atoll
Treaties extended to Puerto Rico
Treaties extended to the United States Virgin Islands
Treaties extended to Wake Island
Treaties of Venezuela
Treaties of Zimbabwe
Treaties extended to the Territory of Papua and New Guinea
Treaties extended to French Morocco
Treaties extended to the French Protectorate of Tunisia
Treaties extended to French Togoland
Treaties extended to French Cameroon
Treaties extended to Netherlands New Guinea
Treaties extended to Surinam (Dutch colony)
Treaties extended to the Western Samoa Trust Territory
Treaties extended to Portuguese Angola
Treaties extended to Portuguese Cape Verde
Treaties extended to Portuguese Guinea
Treaties extended to Portuguese India
Treaties extended to Portuguese Mozambique
Treaties extended to Portuguese São Tomé and Príncipe
Treaties extended to Portuguese Timor
Treaties extended to South West Africa
Treaties extended to British Guiana
Treaties extended to British Honduras
Treaties extended to the Colony of Aden
Treaties extended to British Cyprus
Treaties extended to the Crown Colony of Seychelles
Treaties extended to the Uganda Protectorate
Treaties extended to the Gambia Colony and Protectorate
Treaties extended to the Crown Colony of Singapore
Treaties extended to British Mauritius
Treaties extended to the Federation of Rhodesia and Nyasaland
Treaties extended to the Sultanate of Zanzibar
Treaties extended to the Crown Colony of Malta
Treaties extended to the Colony of Sierra Leone
Treaties extended to the Colony of North Borneo
Treaties extended to British Hong Kong
Treaties extended to the Colony of the Bahamas
Treaties extended to Swaziland (protectorate)
Treaties extended to the Colony of Fiji
Treaties extended to Spanish Sahara
Treaties extended to Spanish Guinea
Treaties extended to the West Indies Federation
Treaties extended to the Panama Canal Zone
Treaties extended to the Territory of Alaska
Treaties extended to the Territory of Hawaii